Alistair Malcolm George Slowe (born 16 October 1988) is an English football midfielder.

Club career
Slowe has now retired from football. He retired in 2018. He could play anywhere but he was best anywhere across the back line but he was most comfortable playing as a right back or a right wing back.

Slowe started his career as a youth player at Brighton & Hove Albion, however he left to focus on school work and exams. At the age of 17, he headed to Ghana to pursue his footballing career after not attaining the grades he wanted. He helped found the Cantonments Soccer Academy in 2006, and spent two seasons with the first team.

In 2008, he was offered a contract with Cypriot side Onisilos Sotira, having impressed two Newcastle United scouts who happened to be in Ghana at the time. He spent two seasons with Sotira, before being offered trials with English sides AFC Wimbledon and Gillingham. As he was still under contract in Cyprus, he was not allowed to accept these trial offers. He was also offered a trial with Newcastle, but due to the Icelandic volcanic eruption of 2010, he had to travel for 4 days to reach England. He was injured in his first training session, and ultimately was not selected for the team.

Slowe joined Northampton Town in 2010, but despite making the bench a number of times, he never made a first team appearance and was released the next year.  Slowe became a cult hit on the Northampton Town forum “The Hotel End”, with posts on one thread reaching 36 pages over eight years.

He then joined Yeovil Town, but again failed to make a first team appearance in his one season there.

He then returned to Cyprus with Achyronas Liopetriou, on loan from Omonia Nicosia, before signing with Ayia Napa, where he made thirty six appearances. He joined Anagennisi Deryneia in 2016 before rejoining Ayia Napa again in 2017 where he ended his career at the end of the 2017/18 season.

He now runs a successful football academy in Ghana.

References

External links

1988 births
Living people
English footballers
English expatriate footballers
Expatriate footballers in Cyprus
Onisilos Sotira players
Northampton Town F.C. players
Yeovil Town F.C. players
Ayia Napa FC players
Anagennisi Deryneia FC players
Cypriot First Division players
Cypriot Second Division players
English expatriate sportspeople in Cyprus
Association football wingers